Albalatillo is a municipality located in the province of Huesca, Aragon, Spain. According to the 2004 census (INE), the municipality has a population of 253 inhabitants.

References 

Municipalities in the Province of Huesca